Church of Hawkwind is the twelfth studio album by Hawkwind, released under the band name Church of Hawkwind in 1982. The name change reflects the fact that this was a musical departure for the band, being a more experimental electronic offering rather than the usual heavy rock that the band were known for at the time.

Dave Brock resurrects the "Dr Technical" alias which he had previously used for production of the band's 1972 hit single "Silver Machine". This is almost a Dave Brock solo album considering the heavy bias towards his work, and none of these tracks were performed live by the band, save "Looking in the Future" which was re-recorded as "Letting in the Past" on It is the Business of the Future to be Dangerous.

"The Phenomenon of Luminosity" features a sample of John Glenn on the Friendship Seven spacecraft during the Mercury-Atlas 6 mission on 20 February 1962. An alternative version of "Experiment With Destiny" had appeared on the preceding year's Sonic Attack album as "Virgin of the World".

Although credited to Dave Brock, the track "Some People Never Die" borrows much of its material from the track "They Call Me Gun" on an obscure LP by "On The Seventh Day" (US Mercury Records 61248, 1970), right down to the Robert F. Kennedy and Lee Harvey Oswald shooting commentaries. Alternative versions of "Some People Never Die" appear on Spacebrock and the Dave Brock solo album Earthed to the Ground (as "Assassination").

The CD bonus tracks on the 1994 Griffin release were recorded in the 1990s and seem at odds with the overall feel of the album, and they were placed in the middle of a resequenced side 2 disrupting the flow of the album, for example the rowing that linked "Some People Never Die" with "Light Specific Data" now has 5 tracks in between. The 2010 Atomhenge CD restores the original running order and provides a different set of bonus material.

Track listing

Side 1: Space
"Angel Voices" (Dave Brock, Harvey Bainbridge) - 1:21 – Brock; Bainbridge
"Nuclear Drive" (Brock) - 3:39 – Brock; Lloyd-Langton; Griffin
"Star Cannibal" (Brock) - 5:31 – Brock; Lloyd-Langton; Griffin
"The Phenomenon of Luminosity" (Brock) - 2:40  – Brock
"Fall of Earth City" (Brock, Bainbridge, Huw Lloyd-Langton) - 3:24 – Brock; Bainbridge; Lloyd-Langton; Griffin
"The Church" (Brock, Lloyd-Langton) - 1:32 – Brock; Lloyd-Langton

Side 2: Fate
"Joker at the Gate" (Brock, Bainbridge) - 1:51 – Brock; Bainbridge; Griffin
"Some People Never Die" (Brock) - 3:52 – Brock; Sperhawk; Bodi
"Light Specific Data" (Brock) - 3:48 – Brock; Bainbridge; Griffin
"Experiment with Destiny" (Brock, Bainbridge) - 2:31 – Brock; Bainbridge; Griffin
"The Last Messiah" (Brock, Bainbridge) - 1:27 – Brock; Bainbridge; Madam X
"Looking in the Future" (Brock) - 4:03 – Brock; Bainbridge; Lloyd-Langton; Griffin

Atomhenge CD bonus tracks
Angel Voices" [Extended Version] (Brock, Bainbridge) - 2:21
"Harvey's Sequence" (Bainbridge) - 3:01
"Fall of Earth City" [Alternate Version] (Brock, Bainbridge, Lloyd-Langton) - 4:50
"Water Music (Light Specific Data)" (Brock) - 4:42
"Looking in the Future" / "Virgin of the World" (Brock) - 10:23

Griffin CD
"Angel Voices" (Brock, Bainbridge) - 1:21
"Nuclear Drive" (Brock) - 3:39
"Star Cannibal" (Brock) - 5:31
"The Phenomenon of Luminosity" (Brock) - 2:40
"Fall of Earth City" (Brock, Bainbridge, Lloyd-Langton) - 3:24
"The Church" (Brock, Lloyd-Langton) - 1:32
"Identimate" (Brock) - 3:45 – bonus track – Brock; Davey; Chadwick
"Some People Never Die" (Brock) - 3:52
"Damage of Life" (Brock) - 5:50 – bonus track – Brock; Davey; Chadwick
"Experiment with Destiny" (Brock, Bainbridge) - 2:31
"Mists of Meridin" (Brock, Alan Davey) - 5:13 – bonus track – Brock; Davey; Chadwick
"Looking in the Future" (Brock) - 4:03
"Joker at the Gate" (Brock, Bainbridge) - 1:51
"Light Specific Data" (Brock) - 3:48
"The Last Messiah" (Brock, Bainbridge) - 1:27

Personnel
Hawkwind
Dave Brock – electric guitar, bass guitar, keyboards, vocals
Huw Lloyd-Langton – electric guitar, vocals
Harvey Bainbridge – bass guitar, keyboards, vocals
Martin Griffin– drums
with
Marc Sperhawk – bass guitar
Capt Al Bodi – drums
Alan Davey – bass guitar
Richard Chadwick – drums
Kris Tait (Madam X) – crying

Credits
Recorded at Rockfield Studios December 1981 to February 1982.
Produced by Dr Technical, engineered by Pat Moran and Ashley Howe.
Cover by Andrew Christian and Partridge/Rushton. Booklet illustrations by John Coulthart and Tim.

Equipment listed
Korg 700 Keyboard
Korg Analogue Seq
Korg MS-20
Korg Polyphonic
Roland Jupiter 4
Roland Sho9
EMS Synthi
2 Roland 201 Space Echoes
Koorlander Time Module
Koorlander Multichorus Delay Module
Pubison
Westone Thunder HI Guitar
Westone Paduak Guitar (stated as "Westone Padewak Guitar" on the original LP sleeve.)
Westone Thunder 1Bass

Release history
May 1982: RCA Active, RCALP9004 – initial copies came with a 12-page lyric book
June 1994: Dojo, DOJOCD86, UK CD
March 1994: Griffin Music, GN0932-2, USA CD
April 2010: Atomhenge (Cherry Red) Records, ATOMCD1021, UK CD

References

External links
Atomhenge Records
Collectable Records – Original cover and booklet

1982 albums
Hawkwind albums
Active Records albums
Albums recorded at Rockfield Studios